Fernando de Andrés Asín (born April 23, 1949 in Zaragoza) is a former Spanish handball player who competed in the 1972 Summer Olympics.

In 1972 he was part of the Spanish team which finished fifteenth in the Olympic tournament. He played three matches and scored nine goals.

References

1949 births
Living people
Sportspeople from Zaragoza
Spanish male handball players
Olympic handball players of Spain
Handball players at the 1972 Summer Olympics